Reitzenschlag is a village and a cadastral municipality of Litschau, a town in the district of Gmünd in Lower Austria, Austria.

Housing Development 
At the turn of 1979/1980 there was a total of 68 building plots with 30,333 m2 and 38 gardens with 22,373 m2, 1989/1990 there were 104 buildings plots. At the turn of 1999/2000, the number of buildings plots had increased to 251 and at the turn of 2009/2010 there were 113 buildings on 240 building plots.

References 

Cities and towns in Gmünd District